CG Bank Field at Roy Kidd Stadium is Eastern Kentucky University's football stadium in Richmond, Kentucky.  The stadium is home to the EKU Colonels football team, located on campus.  Currently, CG Bank Field at Roy Kidd Stadium consists of upper and lower-level seating areas, with a predominant majority of the seats being metal bleachers.  Reserved chairback seats can be found in the middle of the lower level, as well, the seats are generally purchased by season ticket holders and Eastern Alumni.

The Colonels football team has found success playing at CG Bank Field at Roy Kidd Stadium, possessing a 191-43-1 home record.

History
The stadium was originally named Hanger Field, just like its predecessor, but was renamed in 1990 for longtime head football coach Roy Kidd, who won 314 games during his tenure at the Eastern Kentucky and led his teams to two NCAA Division I-AA Championships, in 1979 and 1982. In the 2004 season, 22,700 people ventured to the stadium to watch Eastern Kentucky battle its rival Western Kentucky, making it the fifth largest crowd in the stadium's history.

Renovations
On April 8, 2009, it was announced that the original natural turf was being replaced by SF II synthetic turf for the upcoming 2009 football season.  The home locker rooms, along with new play-clocks and scoreboard, were also included in the minor renovation for that season.

Features
A majority of the football operations, along with a state-of-the-art strength & conditioning and athletic training facilities are located next door in the Moberly Building. The stadium's architecture allows for Roy Kidd Stadium to serve as the "roof" of an academic building known as the Begley Building.  Inside there are: three gymnasiums, two handball courts, 36 classrooms, 60 offices, as well as the locker and training rooms for the football team.

Record attendance

Images

See also
List of NCAA Division I FCS football stadiums

References

College football venues
Eastern Kentucky Colonels football
Buildings and structures in Madison County, Kentucky
American football venues in Kentucky
Sports venues completed in 1969
1969 establishments in Kentucky